Spirotropis studeriana is a species of sea snail, a marine gastropod mollusk in the family Drilliidae.

Description
The shell of this species grows to a length between 11 mm and 22 mm.

The shell is stouter than Spirotropis patagonica, with a shorter body whorl. The ribs are stronger and fewer, evanescent on the body whorl. The revolving lines are slighter and scarcely apparent. The siphonal canal is shorter and broader.

Distribution
This species occurs in the benthic zone of the cold waters off Argentina and the Kerguelen Islands at depths between 646 m and 845 m.

References

  von Martens (1904) Die beschalten Gastropoden der deutschen Tiefsee-Expedition, 1898–1899.. In. A. Systematisch-geographischer Theil., vol. 7 Wissenschaftliche Ergebnisse der deutschen Tiefsee-Expedition auf dem Dampfer "Valdivia" 1898–1899, 1–146
  Tucker, J.K. 2004 Catalog of recent and fossil turrids (Mollusca: Gastropoda). Zootaxa 682:1–1295

External links
 

studeriana
Gastropods described in 1878